Greatest Hits is a greatest hits album by British/Australian soft rock duo Air Supply, released in August 1983. It spent one week on top of the Australian (Kent Music Report) album chart on 26 September 1983. The Jim Steinman-written and produced track "Making Love Out of Nothing at All" was released as a single and is Air Supply's last top 10 hit in the United States, peaking at No. 2 on the Billboard Hot 100. The album was eventually certified 5x platinum in the US, denoting shipments of five million copies.

Background 
British-Australian soft rock group Air Supply had been formed in Melbourne in 1975 by vocalists Russell Hitchcock and Graham Russell. By the late 1970s, they were based in the United States. Their compilation album Greatest Hits was issued by Arista Records in August 1983, which included the new track "Making Love Out of Nothing at All" released as a single in July 1983.

Reception

Track listing
"Lost in Love" (Graham Russell) – 3:51
"Even the Nights Are Better" (Kenneth Bell, Terry Skinner, Jerry Lee Wallace) – 3:57
"The One That You Love" (Russell) – 4:17
"Every Woman in the World" (Dominic Bugatti, Frank Musker) – 3:29
"Chances" (Russell) – 3:32
"Making Love Out of Nothing at All" (Jim Steinman) – 5:15
"All Out of Love" (Clive Davis, Russell) – 4:01
"Here I Am (Just When I Thought I Was Over You)" (Norman Sallitt) – 3:46
"Sweet Dreams" (Russell) – 5:19

Personnel 
Credits (tracks 1–5, 7–9)
 Russell Hitchcock – lead and backing vocals 
 Graham Russell – lead vocals (1, 4, 7), backing vocals (1, 3, 4, 7, 8, 9), rhythm guitar (1, 2, 4, 5, 7), acoustic guitar (3, 8, 9)
 David Moyse – lead guitar (1, 3, 4, 5, 7, 8, 9), bass (1, 4, 5, 7), backing vocals (1, 4, 5, 7), rhythm guitar (3, 8, 9)
 Rex Goh – lead guitar (2), rhythm guitar (8, 9)
 Frank Esler-Smith – keyboards, orchestrations
 David Green – bass (2, 3, 8, 9)
 Ralph Cooper – drums (1-5, 7, 8, 9)

Credits (track 6 "Making Love Out of Nothing at All")

Air Supply
 Russell Hitchcock – lead vocals
 Graham Russell – backing vocals

Musicians
 Roy Bittan – acoustic piano, synthesizers, arrangements 
 Larry Fast – synthesizers 
 Rick Derringer – guitar 
 Sid McGinnis – acoustic guitar 
 Steve Buslowe – bass
 Max Weinberg – drums
 Jimmy Maelen – percussion 
 Jim Steinman – arrangements
 Rory Dodd – additional backing vocals 
 Holly Sherwood – additional backing vocals 
 Eric Troyer – additional backing vocals

Production
 Clive Davis – executive producer 
 Rick Chertoff – producer (1)
 Charles Fisher – producer (1)
 Robie Porter – producer (1, 4, 5, 7)
 Harry Maslin – producer (2, 3, 4, 8, 9), engineer (2, 3, 8, 9)
 Jim Steinman – producer (6), mixing (6)
 John Jansen – associate producer (6), engineer (6), mixing (6)
 Rod Hui – engineer (6)
 Scott Litt – engineer (6)
 Arthur Payson – engineer (6)
 Dee Rob – engineer (6)
 Neil Dorfsman – mixing (6)
 Greg Calbi – mastering (6)
 Donn Davenport – art direction, design  
 Linda Fenimore – illustration
 Don Arden – management

Charts

Weekly charts

Year-end charts

References

External links
 Google Music: Air Supply

1983 greatest hits albums
Air Supply compilation albums
Arista Records compilation albums
Albums produced by Peter Dawkins (musician)